The Komatsu 960E-1 (960E) is an off-highway, ultra-class, rigid-frame, two-axle, diesel/AC electric powertrain haul truck designed and manufactured by Komatsu in Peoria, Illinois, United States. The 960-E1 is the first generation of the 960E series of haul trucks and is alternately referred to by Komatsu specifically as the 960E-1 or generally as the 960E.

The 960E-1 was supplanted by the 980E-4 as the Komatsu's highest capacity haul truck in September 2016, with a haul capacity of 400 tons.

Public debut
Komatsu America Corp. announced the introduction of the 960E-1 on May 27, 2008.

Powertrain
The 960E-1 is powered by a diesel/AC electric powertrain. A  Komatsu SSDA18V170 V18, dual-stage turbocharged diesel engine developed by Industrial Power Alliance, a joint venture between Komatsu and Cummins, is coupled to a General Electric GTA-39 insulated-gate bipolar transistor alternator that sends electrical power to twin General Electric GDY108 induction traction motors, with one induction motor located on each side of the rear axle.

Assembly
The 960E-1 is assembled at Komatsu North America's Peoria Manufacturing Operation in Peoria, IL, USA.

Transportation
Due to its exceptional size and weight, the 960E-1 can not be driven on public roads. The 960E-1 is shipped in component form to the customer site before undergoing final assembly.

Specifications
Fully loaded the 960E-1 weighs  and can achieve a top speed of

Competition
The 960E-1 competes directly with other  payload capacity haul trucks such as the Bucyrus MT5500AC. Depending on customer requirements, the 960E-1 may also place pressure on sales of  payload capacity haul trucks, such as the Bucyrus MT6300AC or the Caterpillar 797F.

See also
 Haul truck

Notes

References

External links 
Komatsu 960E-1 Website Komatsu America Corp.
Komatsu 960E-1 Product Brochure AESS647-00 EV-2 Komatsu America Corp.
Komatsu 960E-1 Product Brochure AESS647-00 EV-1 Komatsu America Corp.
Industrial Power Alliance, Ltd. Website - Diesel engine manufacturer
 - IVT Magazine, March 2009, "Haul of fame" Article on 960E.

Haul trucks
Hybrid trucks
Komatsu vehicles
Vehicles introduced in 2008